Coswig is a town in the district of Wittenberg of Saxony-Anhalt, Germany. It is situated on the right bank of the Elbe, approx. 12 km west of Wittenberg, and 15 km east of Dessau.

History 

The Castle of Coswig was mentioned first in 1187. There is no evidence for slav settlements before this date. In 1215 Coswig is called an "Oppidium". During this time it was one of the most important cities North of the river Elbe.
In the 16th century Coswig was already connected to a drinking water pipe from Wörpen. Weaving, pottery and farming played the most important role in economics. The city was nearly completely destroyed by Hispanic troops during the Schmalkaldic War.
From 1603 to 1793, Coswig belonged to Anhalt-Zerbst.
The Castle was constructed at the end of the 17th century. The railway station was inaugurated on 10 September 1841. In 1987 the city celebrated its 800th-year of existence.

Geography 
The town Coswig consists of Coswig proper and the following Ortschaften or municipal divisions:

Bräsen
Buko
Cobbelsdorf
Düben
Hundeluft
Jeber-Bergfrieden
Klieken
Köselitz
Möllensdorf
Ragösen
Senst
Serno
Stackelitz
Thießen
Wörpen
Zieko

Sights
 Coswig Castle
 Nicolaikirche (church)
 New Apostolic Church
 Coswig Ferry, a reaction ferry across the Elbe to Wörlitz
 Bismarck Tower
 Amtshaus and Townhall

Politics

Turnout at the last election on June 13, 2004, was 43,6%.

Town Council: 20 seat to the following parties:
 7 seats - CDU
 4 seats - Linkspartei.PDS
 3 seats - SPD
 3 seats - Bürgerblock
 2 seats - FWG
 1 seats - FDP

Twin town
  Stadtallendorf, Hesse, since 1993

Sons of the city

 Franz Hübner (1840-1914), missionary and bishop of the New Apostolic Church
 Hermann Cohen (1842-1918), philosopher, founder of the Marburger Schule 
 Paul Mahlo (1883-1971), mathematician
 Manfred Kuschmann (1950-2002), long-distance athlete, European champion in 10,000 metres 1974

People associated with Coswig

 Caroline Bardua (1781-1864), painter, one of the first bourgeois women who could build up an existence as a free-lance artist, worked in Coswig Castle
 Heinrich Berger (1844-1929), military musician, conductor and composer

References

External links

 Official website
 nakcoswig.de - New Apostolic Church Coswig

 
Wittenberg (district)
Duchy of Anhalt
Fläming Heath
Populated riverside places in Germany
Populated places on the Elbe